Consequences is British singer-songwriter Peter Hammill's 33rd solo album, released on his own Fie! Records label in April 2012. As on his previous release, Thin Air, Hammill played all instruments, wrote all the songs and produced the album.

Track listing
 "Eat My Words, Bite My Tongue" (5:30)
 "That Wasn't What I Said" (5:21)
 "Constantly Overheard" (4:19)
 "New Pen-pal" (4:08)
 "Close to Me" (4:10)
 "All The Tiredness" (5:56)
 "Perfect Pose" (7:05)
 "Scissors" (5:23)
 "Bravest Face" (4:45)
 "A Run of Luck" (3:54)

Personnel
 Peter Hammill – vocals, guitars, percussions, keyboards

Technical
Peter Hammill – recording engineer, mixing (Terra Incognita, Wiltshire)
Paul Ridout – design, photography, artwork

References

External links
 

Peter Hammill albums
2012 albums